National Hospital Abuja is a hospital in Abuja, FCT, Nigeria.

The hospital was founded under the Family Support Programme initiative and was formally established under Decree 36 of 1999 (Act 36 of 1999). Abdulsalami Abubakar commissioned the hospital on 22 May 1999. Originally National Hospital For Women And Children, the hospital opened on 1 September 1999. The hospital received its current name on 10 May 2000.

Notable patients
 Mohammed Abacha
 Evan Enwerem
 Aminu Safana

References

External links
 National Hospital Abuja

Hospital buildings completed in 1999
Hospitals established in 1999
Buildings and structures in Abuja
Hospitals in Nigeria
Organizations based in Abuja
1999 establishments in Nigeria
20th-century architecture in Nigeria